The 1945 Lafayette Leopards football team was an American football team that represented Lafayette College in the Middle Three Conference during the 1945 college football season. In its third  and final season under head coach Ben Wolfson, the team compiled a 1–7–1 record. The team was led by game captains and played its home games at Fisher Field in Easton, Pennsylvania.

Schedule

References

Lafayette
Lafayette Leopards football seasons
Lafayette Leopards football